Nadezhda Matyukhina (born 19 February 1954) is a Russian former freestyle swimmer. She competed in three events at the 1972 Summer Olympics for the Soviet Union.

References

External links
 

1954 births
Living people
Russian female freestyle swimmers
Olympic swimmers of the Soviet Union
Swimmers at the 1972 Summer Olympics
Place of birth missing (living people)
Universiade medalists in swimming
Universiade bronze medalists for the Soviet Union
Medalists at the 1973 Summer Universiade
Soviet female freestyle swimmers